Kagaj te Canvas is a book of collection of poems by Amrita Pritam for which she got Jnanpith Award, India's Highest Literary Award in 1981.

References 

Poetry collections